Ingeborg Beling (1904-1988) was a German ethologist from the early 20th century who worked in the field of chronobiology. She studied at the University of Munich under the direction of Karl Von Frisch and is known for her research on the time sense of honey bees.
In her research, in 1929, she trained bees to come to a feeding station at a specific time of day, day after day. This contribution ultimately led to the discovery of the bees’ 24-hour biological clock. Because of this achievement, she was regarded as one of the first female chronobiologists.  Beyond honeybees, much of Beling's work involved studying behaviors of wasps, fly pupae, etc. Finally, she also did some research in pest control.

Bee-feeding experiment (1929) 

Beling wrote in her widely cited 1929 paper, titled "Über das Zeitgedächtnis der Bienen"  (“On the Time Memory of Bees”) published in the Journal of Comparative Physiology, that the early observations of Forel, v. Buttel-Reepen and Dobkiewicz promoted her to study the intriguing behavior of bees, termed Zeitgedächtnis, or time memory.  In her pioneer experiments, Beling trained a group of individually marked foraging bees to fly to a feeding dish, which was filled with sugar water only at certain times of the day (for example, between 4 and 6 PM). During the testing phase, the dish was empty throughout the day and every visiting bee was recorded. She found that the bees only visited the feeding station at trained time, even when the sugar water was removed. Specifically, Beling found that the bees can anticipate the food by showing up just a little early every morning. Further more, she found that bees could be trained to show up at the feeding station at any time of the day, and even for multiple times a day. However, Beling did report that the bees could only be trained to a period close to 24 hours, but not 19 or 48 hours as she tested. These results were still present when Beling controlled potential environmental cues such as humidity, temperature, light and radiation.

Contributions to chronobiology 
Beling was able to show that bees have an astonishing memory of time. She found that this time memory is both rigorous (the bees consistently show up at the expected time) and flexible (the bees can be trained to show up any time of night or day, even two or three times a day). Beling found that bees could only train to periods close to 24 hours. This 24-hour rhythm in bees has biological significance in that it is evolutionarily advantageous, helping the bees coordinate with flowers when they are gathering nectar and helping them avoid flying at dangerous predator-filled times of day. The bees' anticipation of the feeding is also advantageous - by knowing the time of day, the bees can prepare themselves for the meal and enable a faster response.  Beling's research was unable to conclusively show whether bees have some kind of internal biological clock that is controlling this behavior or if there is some external cue acting as a Zeitgeber that she did not account for in her experiments.

Related terms
Much of the early work in chronobiology was done in Germany, so publications were largely written in German. Some terms created at this time are still being used or often referred to today. The father of chronobiology, Colin Pittendrigh, critiqued these terms, saying that researchers in Munich have trouble letting go of these terms. He argues that ‘training’ and ‘memory’ do not capture the innate components of the behavior.

Related chronobiologists 

Beling was one of the earliest chronobiologists who studied the rhythms of bees. Her work grew from the observations of previous scientists (Forel, Buttel-Reepen, von Frisch) and helped inspire further experimentation (Wahl, Renner). Standing on the shoulders of these researchers, Pittendrigh took the field of chronobiology to the modern era by studying biological clocks in fruit flies and is regarded as the father of modern chronobiology.

References 

Chronobiologists
Ethologists
Ludwig Maximilian University of Munich alumni
1904 births
1988 deaths
20th-century German zoologists